The Habibis (stylised as The haBiBis) is an Australian band that plays traditional Greek music.  They won the ARIA Award for Best World Music Album with their album Intoxication.

Members
 Irine Vela - laouto, bouzouki, guitar
 Pascal Latra - vocals, baglama, percussion
 Mulaim Vela - guitar
 Rachel Cogan - recorder
 Achilles Yiangoulli - bouzouki, vocals, percussion
 Wendy Rowlands - violin
 Sotiris Traianopoulos - clarinet
 Jenny M Thomas - violin

Discography

Albums

Awards and nominations

ARIA Music Awards
The ARIA Music Awards is an annual awards ceremony that recognises excellence, innovation, and achievement across all genres of Australian music. They commenced in 1987. The Cat Empire has won one award.

! 
|-
| 1999
| Intoxication
| ARIA Award for Best World Music Album
| 
| 
|-

References

Australian world music groups
ARIA Award winners